Krodh (Gurmukhi: ਕਰੋਧ Karōdha) is derived from the Sanskrit word krodha (क्रोध), which means wrath or rage. This is an emotion recognized in the Sikh system as a spring of desire and is as such counted as one of the Five Evils.

It expresses itself in several forms from silent sullenness to hysterical tantrums and violence.  In Sikh Scripture krodh usually appears in combination with kam — as "kam krodh".  The coalescence is not simply for the sake of alliterative effect.  Krodh (ire) is the direct progeny of kam (desire). The latter when thwarted or jilted produces the former.  The Scripture also counts krodh (or its synonym kop) among the four rivers of fire.  

"Violence, attachment, covetousness and wrath," says  Shri Guru Nanak Dev Ji "are like four rivers of fire; those who fall in them burn, and can swim across, O Nanak, only through God's grace" (GG, 147).  Elsewhere Shri Guru Nanak Dev Ji says, "Kam and krodh dissolve the body as borax melts gold" (GG, 932).   Shri Guru Arjan Dev Ji, Nanak V, censures krodh in these words: "O krodh, thou enslavest sinful men and then caperest around them like an ape."  

In thy company men become base and are punished variously by Death's messengers.  The Merciful God, the Eradicator of the sufferings of the humble, O Nanak, alone saveth all" (GG, 1358).  Shri Guru Ram Das Ji, Nanak IV, warns: "Do not go near those who are possessed by wrath uncontrollable" (GG, 40).  Krodh is to be vanquished and eradicated.  This is done through humility and firm faith in the Divine.  

Shri Guru Arjan Dev Ji's prescription: "Do not be angry with any one; search your own self and live in the world with humility.  Thus, O Nanak, you may go across (the ocean of existence) under God's grace" (GG, 259).  Shaikh Farid, a thirteenth-century Muslim saint whose compositions are preserved in the Sikh Scripture, says in one of his couplets: "O Farid, do good to him who hath done thee evil and do not nurse anger in thy heart; no disease will then afflict thy body and all felicities shall be thine" (GG, 1381-82).  Righteous indignation against evil, injustice and tyranny is, however, not to be equated with krodh as an undesirable passion.   Several hymns in the Shri Guru Granth Sahib Ji, particularly those by Shri Guru Nanak Dev Ji and Bhagat Kabir Ji, express in strong terms their disapproval of the corruption of their day.

References 

 Sabadarth Sri Guru Granth Sahib Ji. Amritsar, 1964
 Jodh Singh, Bhai, Gurmat Nirnaya. Ludhiana, 1932
 Sher Singh, The Philosophy of Sikhism. Lahore, 1944		
 Avtar Singh, Ethics of the Sikhs. Patiala, 1970
 Nirbhai Singh, Philosophy of Sikhism. Delhi, 1990

Above adapted from article By L. M. Joshi

 Concepts In Sikhism - Edited by Dr. Surinder Singh Sodhi
 Lecture on Krodh #1 by Veer Bhupinder Singh
 Lecture on Krodh #2 by Veer Bhupinder Singh

Sikh terminology